The 1st Annual Premios Odeón was held on January 20, 2020 at the Teatro Real in Madrid. It was broadcast on Televisión Española at 10 p.m. CET. Nominations were revealed on December 19, 2019 during a press conference where they stated that "this award ceremony is considered the successor of the Premios Amigo and the Premios de la Música" which were canceled in 2007 and 2012 due to the Spanish economical crisis as well as the lack of strength of the Spanish musical industry. Thus, the fact that this award show were able to happen symbolizes the revival of the Spanish musical industry after a long period of weakness and irrelevance.

Background 
In December 2019 the Premios Odeón were announced in a press conference as the equivalent to the Grammy Awards in Spain. Thus, this award ceremony, organized by the Asociación de Gestión de Derechos Intelectuales (AGEDI). Nominations were announced on December 19 with Spanish singer-songwriter Rosalía leading nominations with seven. On January 17 it was announced that La 1 would broadcast the ceremony. The person responsible for the scenography was Suso33. Spanish humorist Quequé hosted the gala.

Controversy 
The ceremony was well organised even though many technical difficulties happened during its broadcast during presentations, monologues and musical performances. This pushed Radio Televisión Española to emit a communicate where they asked for explanations to the organizers of the Premios Odeón for technical errors: "The desire of the RTVE management team to promote and support music motivated the commitment to broadcast the Premios Odeón gala on January 20, on La 1, live and in the time slot maximum audience. Unfortunately, the result of this gala, held and produced by AGEDI, was very far from the quality standards that RTVE demands in its programs. RTVE Management regrets the inconvenience that these technical problems and mismatches produced in the audience and has requested explanations from the event organizers".

The Premios Odeón were also criticized for being quote "elitist" and in favor to the main multi-million dollar record labels. Most professionals highlighted the marginalization of independent artist or simply artists that do not belong to Universal or Sony Music. Awards like Best Live are not given to the artist with the best vocal ability but to the one who has sold more tickets over the past year, something that was very criticized.

Performers

Nominees and winners 
The following is the list of nominees.

Song of the Year - presented by Andrés Ceballo and Nathy Peluso

Don Patricio featuring Cruz Cafuné — "Contando Lunares"

 Rosalía, J Balvin and El Guincho — "Con Altura"
 Don Patricio — "Enchochado de Ti"
 La Nueva Escuela and Omar Montes — "La Rubia (Remix)"
 Rosalía — "Malamente"
 Beret — "Lo Siento"
 Lola Indigo and Mala Rodríguez — "Mujer Bruja"
 Rosalia — "Milionària"
 Morat and Aitana — "Presiento"
 Rosalía featuring Ozuna — "Yo X Ti, Tu X Mi"

Album of the Year - presented by Laura Pausini and Pablo López

Alejandro Sanz — #ElDisco

 Aitana — Spoiler
 Marea — El Azogue
 El Barrio — El Danzar de las Mariposas
 Rosalía — El Mal Querer
 Manuel Carrasco — La Cruz del Mapa
 Leiva — Nuclear
 Natalia Lacunza — Otras Alas
 Camela — Rebobinando
 Vanesa Martín — Todas las Mujeres Que Habitan en Mí

Best Music Video — presented by Amaral

Rosalía, J Balvin and El Guincho — "Con Altura" (by Director X)

 C. Tangana and Becky G — "Booty" (by Pablo Larcuen)
 Don Patricio and Cruz Cafuné — "Contando Lunares" (by Golden Beetle Films)
 Rosalía — "Malamente" (by CANADA)
 Alejandro Sanz and Camila Cabello — "Mi Persona Favorita" (by Gil Green)
 David Bisbal and Greeicy — "Perdón" (by Starlite)
 Morat and Aitana — "Presiento" (by Lyona)
 Aitana — "Teléfono" (by Mauri D. Galiano)
 Lola Indigo — "Ya No Quiero Ná" (by Bruno Valverde)
 Rosalía and Ozuna — "Yo X Ti, Tu X Mi" (by RJ Sanchez and Pasqual Gutierrez)

Best New Artist — presented by Álvaro Soler and Mala Rodríguez

Aitana

 Adexe & Nau
 Alba Reche
 Alfred García
 Ana Guerra
 Beret
 Cepeda
 Don Patricio
 Lola Indigo
 Natalia Lacunza

Best Male Artist — presented by Alaska and Camela

Beret

 Alejandro Sanz
 Antonio José
 C. Tangana
 Don Patricio
 El Barrio
 Joaquín Sabina
 Leiva
 Manuel Carrasco
 Sergio Dalma

Best Female Artist — presented by Macaco and Niña Pastori

Vanesa Martín

 Aitana
 Alba Reche
 Amaia
 Ana Guerra
 Lola Indigo
 Mónica Naranjo
 Natalia Lacunza
 Rosalía
 Rozalén

Best Group — presented by Mikel Erentxun and Ariel Rot

Estopa

 Adexe & Nau
 Amaral
 Camela
 DVICIO
 Fangoria
 IZAL
 Mägo de Oz
 Marea
 Oques Grasses

Best Latin Artist — presented by Ana Guerra and Carlos Baute

Morat

 Anuel AA
 Bad Bunny
 Daddy Yankee
 Danny Ocean
 J Balvin
 Lunay
 Maluma
 Ozuna
 Paulo Londra

Flamenco Album of the Year - presented by Paco León and Tomasito

José Mercé and Tomatito — De Verdad

Best Live - presented by Álvaro Urquillo and Tini

Manuel Carrasco — La Cruz del Mapa Tour

Honorific Award - presented by Antonio Guisasola and Edurne

José Luis Perales

Multiple Nominations and Awards 
The following received multiple nominations.

References 

2020 in Spanish music
2020 in Latin music